The following is a list of villages in Zakarpattia Oblast in Ukraine.

Berehove Raion (Берегівський район)

Khust Raion (Хустський район)

Mukacheve Raion (Мукачівський район)

Rakhiv Raion (Рахівський район)

Tiachiv Raion (Тячівський район)

Uzhhorod Raion (Ужгородський район)

Other Villages 

Cherna
Chepa
Chornotysiv
Chornyi Potik, Vynohradiv Raion
Drotyntsi
Diula
Fertesholmash
Forholan
Hetynia
Holmovets
Horbky
Hudia
Hyzha
Karachyn
Mala Kopania
Matiovo
Nevetlenfoly
Nove Klynove
Nove Selo
Novoselytsia, Vynohradiv Raion
Okli
Okli Hegy

Oleshnyk
Onok
Perehrestia
Pidvynohradiv
Prytysianske
Pushkino
Pyiterfolvo
Ruska Dolyna
Sasovo
Shyroke
Tekovo
Velyka Kopania
Velyka Palad
Velyki Komiaty
Verbove
Verbovets
Veriatsia
Zatysivka

References 
 Закарпатська область 

Zakarpattia